The Freedom Bloc, later known as Dobama-Sinyetha Asiayone, was a political party in Burma during World War II.

History
The party was established by a merger of Dobama Asiayone (DAA), Ba Maw's Poor Man's Party and the All-Burma Students Association, and was known as the "Htwet Yat Gain" ("Association of the Way Out"), although DAA leaders secretly formed the People's Revolutionary Party at the time of the merger. It opposed cooperation with the British war effort unless Burma was guaranteed independence immediately after the war, and threatened to increase its anti-British and anti-war campaign. As a result, the Governor ordered the arrest of the Bloc's leadership, most of whom remained in prison until the Japanese invasion of 1942.

Following the onset of the Japanese occupation, the party was renamed Dobama-Sinyetha Asiayone and dropped its anti-fascist and socialist outlook due to the Japanese presence. Ba Maw became Head of State and leader of the renamed party.

In 1944 the party was dissolved, with the Greater Burma Party formed to replace it.

References

Defunct political parties in Myanmar
1944 disestablishments in Burma
Political parties disestablished in 1944
Burma in World War II